Mein Odem ist schwach (My breath is weak), BWV 222, is a church cantata composed by Johann Ernst Bach II. It had been accredited to Johann Sebastian Bach. The intended occasion and the librettist are unknown.

Scoring and structure
The cantata is scored for soprano, alto and bass soloists, SATB choir, two violins, viola and organ.

It is six movements:
Aria (bass): Mein Odem ist schwach
Aria (alto): O seid mir sehnsuchtsvoll geküßt
Chorus: Unser Wandel ist im Himmel
Chorale: Wie du mir, Herr, befohlen hast
Chorale: Lass mich nur, Herr, wie Simeon
Chorus: Wir aber sind getrost und haben vielmehr Lust

Motet Unser Wandel ist im Himmel 
The motet Unser Wandel ist im Himmel, BWV Anh. 165 is derived from movements 3, 4 and 6 of the cantata Mein Odem ist schwach. As for the cantata its authorship is attributed to Johann Ernst Bach II.

Recording
Alsfelder Vokalensemble / Steintor Barock Bremen, Wolfgang Helbich. The Apocryphal Bach Cantatas. CPO, 1991.

References

Church cantatas
Bach: spurious and doubtful works
Compositions by Johann Ernst Bach II
German church music